Zhang Yongzhen, also known as Yong-Zhen Zhang, is a Chinese virologist known for his work relating to the COVID-19 pandemic. A professor at Fudan University, Zhang has discovered numerous RNA viruses and created a network of labs dedicated to monitoring new viruses. He led the team that sequenced and published the genome of SARS-CoV-2, the virus that causes COVID-19, in early January 2020.

According to Time, Zhang was the "saving grace" of the COVID-19 pandemic. Zhang's team's success in discovering and publishing the virus's genome allowed scientists to quickly design COVID-19 tests, fight the pandemic, and begin developing COVID-19 vaccines. A government order prohibited labs from publishing information about the virus at the time, but Zhang said he was not aware of the order, and they received no penalty for releasing the data.

Zhang was named one of [[Nature's 10|Nature'''s 10]]: "ten people who helped shape science in 2020", and was winner of the 2020 ICG-15 GigaScience Prize for Outstanding Data Sharing during the COVID-19 Pandemic. Alongside Edward C. Holmes he was awarded the 2021 General Symbiont prize as an exemplar in the practice of data sharing at the Research Parasite Awards. He was also one of Time's 100 most influential people of 2020 and Straits Times 2020 Asians of the Year.

Education

Zhang studied at South China Agricultural University, Southern Medical University, and Kunming Institute of Zoology.

Career

Zhang is a professor at Fudan University in Shanghai and works at the Chinese Center for Disease Control and Prevention. His research involves RNA sequencing, and he has discovered numerous RNA viruses with collaborator Edward C. Holmes of the University of Sydney. He has created a network of labs dedicated to monitoring novel viruses.

His laboratory, a Level 3 biosafety lab, is part of the Shanghai Public Health Clinical Center.

In 2019, Zhang got preliminary approval for funding from the Ministry of Science and Technology of China to run a national survey and database of pathogenic viruses, though as of 2020 the project was delayed by red tape.

COVID-19 pandemic

On 3 January 2020, Zhang's team received a test tube containing swabs from the initial outbreak of a pneumonia outbreak in Wuhan, caused by what would eventually be known as COVID-19. Zhang and his team were able to sequence the virus's genome by 2AM on 5 January. On that day Zhang uploaded the genome to the United States National Center for Biotechnology Information and notified the Shanghai municipal health authority. Zhang also contacted Wuhan Central Hospital and the Chinese Ministry of Health, arguing that the virus was similar to SARS and that it spread by respiratory transmission. He advised "emergency public measures to protect against this disease" and the development of antiviral treatments.

On 11 January, Edward C. Holmes contacted Zhang for permission to publish the virus's genome. Zhang granted permission, and Holmes published the genome on virological.org that day. The Chinese government had prohibited labs from publishing information about the new coronavirus, though Zhang later said he did not know about the prohibition. The next day, the Shanghai Health Commission ordered Zhang's laboratory to close temporarily for "rectification". In an interview published by Nature Magazine in December 2020, Zhang said officials issued the order to update biosafety protocols. On 24 January the lab was accredited to research the novel coronavirus. Over the next three months the lab tested more than 30,000 viral samples, according to Fan Wu, another researcher involved in sequencing SARS-CoV-2.

On 3 February 2020, Zhang's team's discovery was published in the journal Nature''.

Of the early response to the COVID-19 outbreak, Zhang later said, "nobody listened to us, and that’s really tragic."

See also
 Li Lanjuan
 Zhong Nanshan

References

1965 births
Living people
Chinese virologists
Academic staff of Fudan University
South China Agricultural University alumni